The third season of Yu-Gi-Oh! 5D's (with the title Road to Destiny for the English dub) lasts from episodes 65 to 92. Following the battle with the Dark Signers, the city is reformed and turbo dueling has changed, but a new threat looms, as the 3 Emperors of Yliaster come into play. This season uses two pieces of theme music. The opening theme is "Freedom" by La Vie, while the ending theme is "O-Zone" by Vistlip. Certain episodes also use the insert song "You Say" by La Vie.

The season aired on Toonzai between September 18, 2010, and December 18, 2010, with the exception of Episode 85, which debuted on Hulu on November 27, 2010, and aired on Television (Toonzai) on February 5, 2011.

The movie Yu-Gi-Oh!: Bonds Beyond Time also takes place within Season 3, before the events of Crash Town (Episodes 86–92).

Episode list

References

2009 Japanese television seasons
2010 Japanese television seasons
5D's (season 3)